The SGH-G800 is a slider mobile phone part of the Samsung G-series. It features a 5-megapixel camera with xenon flash as well as 3x optical zoom, a very rare feature for a camera phone. It was introduced in October 2007 and released in November.

The phone uses microSD cards. It has FM-radio and mp3 playback. This was one of the first mobile phones with 5-megapixel camera (the previous G600 had it before though). Product's software allows many options for taking photos and photo editor. It can be charged with power adapter or via USB cable. It has a 2.4-inch QVGA LCD display. Samsung advertised the G800 as the "world's first 5 megapixel camera phone with 3x optical zoom".

The handset was succeeded by the Samsung SGH-G810.

Features
Vibration : Available
Camera Flash : Xenon
Camera Optics :  Optical Zoom
Video Recording : Available
Java : MIDP 2.0
Bluetooth : v2.0

Critical response
The Register praised its camera while noting that the optical zoom added bulk. CNET gave 3.5/5, praising the camera and call quality but criticising the camera flash and web browser. Trusted Reviews awarded 8/10. TechRadar praised the camera and optical zoom ability, but criticised the lack of Wi-Fi or smartphone operating system.

See also
Other 5-megapixel phones of the time
Sony Ericsson K850
LG Viewty
Nokia N95
Nokia N82

References

G800
Mobile phones introduced in 2007
Slider phones